Faded may refer to:

 "Faded", a song by Ben Harper from the 1997 album The Will to Live
 "Faded" (soulDecision song), 1999
 "Faded" (Kate DeAraugo song), 2005
 "Faded" (Tyga song), 2012
 "Faded", a song by Lizzo from the 2013 album Lizzobangers
 "Faded", a song by Mariah Carey from the 2014 album Me. I Am Mariah... The Elusive Chanteuse
 "Faded" (Zhu song), 2014
 "Faded" (Alan Walker song), 2015
 "Faded" a song by Kim Petras featuring lil aaron released in 2017
 Faded (EP), by Flagship, 2016

See also 
 Fade (disambiguation)